Monique van Vooren (March 25, 1927 – January 25, 2020) was a Belgian-American actress and dancer.

Early years
Born in Brussels to George Bronz (or Bronze) and Louise van Vooren, Monique was a champion skater and a beauty queen in Belgium. She reportedly studied philosophy and languages and learned to speak English, Italian, French, German, Spanish, and Dutch. "I can also read Greek and Latin," she stated. Her first visit to the United States apparently took place in 1946 at age 19, with the married name "Jakobson" and listed as a "housewife". Her second husband was Kurt (or Curt) Henry Pfenniger. Her third husband was New York businessman Gerard Walter Purcell. The couple were married from 1958 until Purcell's death in 2002.

Career
On Broadway, Van Vooren played in John Murray Anderson's Almanac (1953–54) and Man on the Moon (1975). In the 1960s, Van Vooren starred in summer stock theatre productions in the United States. Van Vooren recorded an album, Mink in HiFi for RCA Victor. In 1956, she signed a contract with Request Records.

In 1983, Signet published Night Sanctuary, written by Van Vooren. She described the book as being about "the dark side of people."

Later life and legal problems
In 1983, Van Vooren was found guilty of lying before a federal grand jury and "ordered to get psychiatric help and perform 500 hours of community service as part of a suspended sentence." The sentence resulted from an investigation of "whether she had pocketed her dead mother's Social Security payments." Van Vooren died of cancer on January 25, 2020.

Filmography

1950: Tomorrow Is Too Late - Giannina
1953: Tarzan and the She-Devil - Lyra, the She-Devil
1955: The Infiltrator - Elaine
1955: Ça va barder - Irène
1957: Producers' Showcase (Episode: "Mayerling", TV film released theatrically in Europe) 
1957: Ten Thousand Bedrooms - Girl on Main Title
1958: Gigi - showgirl (uncredited)
1959: Sunday Showcase (TV Series) - Zizi Molnari
 "What Makes Sammy Run?: Part 1" (1959)
 "What Makes Sammy Run?: Part 2" (1959)
1959: Happy Anniversary - Jeanette Revere
1961: The DuPont Show of the Month (TV Series) - Krys
 "Trick or Treason"
1959–1963: The United States Steel Hour (TV Series)
 "A Taste of Champagne" (1959) - Simone Durrell
 "Southwest Quarter" (1963)
1965: The Trials of O'Brien (TV Series)
 "Goodbye and Keep Cool" (1965) - Eve St. Clair
1967: Fearless Frank - Plethora
1968: Batman (TV Series)
 "Nora Clavicle and the Ladies' Crime Club" (1968) - Miss Clean (uncredited)
 "Penguin's Clean Sweep" (1968) - Miss Clean
1971: The Decameron - Queen of Skulls (as Monique Van Voren)
1973: Sugar Cookies - Helene
1973: Ash Wednesday - German Woman
1973: Andy Warhol's Frankenstein - Baroness Katrin Frankenstein
1987: Wall Street - "Woman at '21'"
2012: Greystone Park - Monique (final film role)

References

External links
 
 

1927 births
2020 deaths
Belgian emigrants to the United States
American film actresses
American television actresses
American musical theatre actresses
21st-century American women